The Basilica of the National Shrine of St. Ann is a Minor Basilica and National Shrine of the Catholic Church located in Scranton, Pennsylvania within the Diocese of Scranton.

Description
The first temporary chapel on this site, founded by the Passionist order as a monastery church, was erected in 1902; the present building was dedicated on April 2, 1929. The church was declared a minor basilica by Pope John Paul II on October 27, 1997. The basilica is the site of an annual solemn novena in honor of St. Ann, which draws thousands of pilgrims every year.

References

Ann, Basilica of the National Shrine of St.
Ann, Basilica of the National Shrine of St.
Ann, Basilica of the National Shrine of St.
Ann, Basilica of the National Shrine of St.
Ann, Basilica of the National Shrine of St.
Ann, Basilica of the National Shrine of St.
Buildings and structures in Scranton, Pennsylvania
20th-century Roman Catholic church buildings in the United States